The Fire House No. 2 in Billings, Montana, at 201 E. 30th St., was built in 1911.  It has also been known as the South Side Fire Station.  It was listed on the National Register of Historic Places in 1980.

It is Prairie School in style with ornamentation in abstracted Greek Revival style.  It is a two-story red brick building with a full basement.  On its second floor it included an apartment for the fire chief and residence for the firemen.

References

Fire stations on the National Register of Historic Places in Montana
National Register of Historic Places in Yellowstone County, Montana
Prairie School architecture in Montana
Fire stations completed in 1911